To Hell with the Devil is the third studio album by the Christian metal band Stryper, released in 1986. It was the first Christian metal album to achieve platinum status, selling over one million copies. It remained the best-selling Christian metal album until P.O.D.'s Satellite in 2001.

The album was listed at No. 88 in the 2001 book, CCM Presents: The 100 Greatest Albums in Christian Music. The album was the only heavy metal album on the list. Ian Christe, author of the heavy metal history book Sound of the Beast: The Complete Headbanging History of Heavy Metal (2003), mentions To Hell with the Devil in his book as one of the landmarks of the glam metal movement.
Throughout 1987, both music videos for "Free" and "Honestly" ranked No. 1 on Dial MTV, the daily MTV list of most requested videos.  The first single/video video for "Calling on You" also reached No. 2 on the show. "Honestly" was the biggest single from the record peaking at #23 on Billboard's Hot 100 Singles Chart.

The original artwork depicted four long haired angels (closely resembling the band members) throwing the devil into a fiery pit. The cover was then changed on later pressings to a basic black cover with the Stryper logo and the album title in the center.

According to Michael Sweet's autobiography, as the band started to record the album, Michael felt Tim Gaines wasn't the right bassist for the record. He was replaced by bassist Matt Hurich, who eventually ended up not working out. So session bassist Brad Cobb took Gaines' place while recording the album. However, before the tour began, Sweet asked Gaines to rejoin as he felt it wasn't right performing as "Stryper" without him.

In 2010, HM Magazine listed To Hell with the Devil No. 3 on its Top 100 Christian Rock Albums of All Time list stating that "when this album broke, it went multi-platinum, forever raising the ceiling of what heavy Christian music could do." Heaven's Metal fanzine ranked it No. 6 on its Top 100 Christian metal albums of all-time list.

Track listing
All songs written by Michael Sweet except as noted
 "Abyss (To Hell with the Devil)" – 1:21
 "To Hell with the Devil" (M. Sweet, Robert Sweet) – 4:08
 "Calling on You" – 3:59
 "Free" (M. Sweet, R. Sweet) – 3:44
 "Honestly" – 4:10
 "The Way" (Oz Fox) – 3:37
 "Sing-Along Song" – 4:21
 "Holding On" – 4:16
 "Rockin' the World" – 3:30
 "All of Me" – 3:11
 "More Than a Man" – 4:35

Personnel 
Stryper
 Michael Sweet – lead vocals, backing vocals, lead and rhythm guitars, arrangements
 Oz Fox – lead guitars, backing vocals
 Robert Sweet – drums

Additional musicians
 John Van Tongeren – keyboards
 Brad Cobb – session bassist

Production 
 Oz Fox – producer
 Michael Sweet – producer 
 Robert Sweet – producer, cover concept 
 Stephan Galfas – producer, arrangements, engineer 
 Dan Nebanzal – engineer
 Eddy Schreyer – mastering
 Brian Ayuso – art direction
 Ray Brown – costume design
 Annamaria DiSanto – photography
 Anna Revenge – photography
 Neil Zlozower – photography

Singles 
"Free"/"Calling on You" - released February 10, 1987 (Enigma Records 75001)
"Honestly"/"Sing-Along Song" - released August 10, 1987 (Enigma 75009)

Videos 
 "Calling On You"
 "Free"
 "Honestly"
 "All of Me" (on the documentary ''Stryper: In the Beginning')

Certifications

References 

Stryper albums
1986 albums